Evergreen is an American television miniseries that aired on NBC from February 24–26, 1985, starring Lesley Ann Warren as a Polish immigrant to America, and based on the novel by Belva Plain.

Plot summary
Anna, a Jewish girl, arrives in America from Poland in 1909. She rises from penniless maid to wealthy matriarch, torn by her love for two men, her husband and an aristocrat. The six-hour romantic saga spans three generations over more than 50 years.

Cast
 Lesley Ann Warren as Anna Friedman
 Armand Assante as Joseph Friedman
 Ian McShane as  Paul Lerner
 Betty Buckley as Mrs. Bradford
 Brian Dennehy as Matthew Malone
 Robert Vaughn as John Bradford
 Katherine Borowitz as Ruth
 Joan Allen as Iris Friedman
 Boyd Gaines as Chris Bradford
 Barbara Montgomery as Celeste 
 Jan Tříska as Dr. Theo Stoller
 Jackie Burroughs as Dorothy 
 Patricia Barry as Mrs. Lerner
 Kate Burton as Agatha Bradford
 Ron Rifkin as Solly

Reception
The Los Angeles Times review complained that the story was "simple, straightforward and entirely predictable. So few twists and turns does Jerome Kass' script take that the family's one dark secret remains just that, with only the audience the wiser. There is no dramatic payoff."

Awards and nominations
Primetime Emmy Award
 Primetime Emmy Award for Outstanding Art Direction for a Miniseries or Movie (won) - Jan Scott, Charles C. Bennett, David Davis, Robert Drumheller, Jacques M. Bradette
 Primetime Emmy Award for Outstanding Cinematography for a Miniseries or Movie - Woody Omens (nominated)
 Primetime Emmy Award for Outstanding Costumes for a Miniseries, Movie or a Special - Julie Weiss (nominated)

References

External links
 

1985 television films
1985 films
American television films
NBC original programming
1980s American television miniseries
Television series set in the 20th century
Films directed by Fielder Cook